Saturday Live can refer to:
 Saturday Live (Irish TV series), an Irish television talk show
 Saturday Live (UK TV series), a British television comedy series
 Saturday Live (radio series), a British radio series
 Saturday Live (Sky News), a Saturday morning show on Sky News
 Saturday Live, a spin-off of Friday Live, an Australian short-run election series on Sky News Live

See also
 Saturday Night Live, an American television comedy series